Matthew E. S. Matich (born 10 July 1991) is a New Zealand rugby union player who plays for  in the Bunnings NPC. His position of choice is Number 8.

References 

Living people
1991 births
New Zealand rugby union players
Auckland rugby union players
Northland rugby union players
Chiefs (rugby union) players
Blues (Super Rugby) players
Yacare XV players
Rugby union flankers
Rugby union players from the Northland Region